Ttujur is a village in the Aparan Municipality of the Aragatsotn Province of Armenia. The village 's church is dedicated to Saint Harutyun. The village also contains a 17th-century shrine called Karmir Vank.

References 

Populated places in Aragatsotn Province